USCGC Chincoteague has been the name of more than one United States Coast Guard ship, and may refer to:

 , a tug in commission from 1919 to 1923
 , a cutter in commission from 1949 to 1972
 , a patrol boat in commission since 1988

United States Coast Guard ship names